Azur may refer to:
 Azur, Landes, France
 Azur (satellite), Germany's first scientific satellite
 Azur Air, a charter airline and former regional airline in Russia
 MPM-10 Azur, train used in the Montreal Metro
 MS Royal Iris, formerly named MS Azur and MS The Azur
 Azor, Israel, also called "Azur"
 Azor, son of Eliakim, mentioned briefly in the Genealogy of Jesus in Matthew 1:13-14
 Azour, Lebanon

AZUR may refer to:
 AZUR (software), a chromatography software
 Actions en zone urbaine (French, Urban Operations)

See also
 Azor (disambiguation)
 Azura (disambiguation)
 Azure (disambiguation)
 French Riviera, also known as Côte d'Azur (Azure Coast)